The MV Fingal is a former Northern Lighthouse Board ship converted into a boutique hotel. The Fingal is permanently berthed near to the former Royal Yacht Britannia as part of a major tourist attraction in Edinburgh, Scotland.

History 
The MV Fingal was built by the Blythswood Shipbuilding Company in Glasgow, Scotland for the Northern Lighthouse Board. Launched in 1963, she was stationed for thirty years in Oban and then for six years in Stromness as a maintenance and supply vessel for lighthouses and buoys. The Fingal was retired from Northern Lighthouse Board service in the year 2000.

Following her retirement from the Northern Lighthouse Board, the Fingal was sold to Hong Kong based Tamahine Investments, who renamed her Windsor Castle. The ship was maintained in working order for the next 14 years while moored on the River Fal in Cornwall.

In 2014, the Windsor Castle was acquired by the Royal Yacht Britannia Trust who restored her original name.  

 

In 2016, the MV Fingal was painted in a dazzle pattern designed by the artist Ciara Phillips as part of commemorations marking 100 years since the battle of Jutland.  The pattern used was a contemporary reimagining of dazzle camouflage specifically created to recognize the role of British women during World War I.

In 2019, following extensive modifications and refurbishment, the Fingal was formally opened as a luxury floating hotel berthed in the Albert Dock Basin close to the former Royal Yacht Britannia at Ocean Terminal, Edinburgh.

See also 
 Northern Lighthouse Board 
 Royal Yacht Britannia

References

External links

Ships built on the River Clyde
Hotels in Edinburgh
Hotels in Scotland